"Cushie Butterfield" is a famous Geordie folk song written in the 19th century by Geordie Ridley, in the style of the music hall popular in the day. It is regarded by many as the second unofficial anthem of Tyneside after Blaydon Races.

This now famous local piece pokes fun at one of the many (at the time) whitening-stone sellers. The stone, made of baked clay (or "yella clay") was used to clean and decorate the stone steps leading up to the front door of the many terrace houses in the area (The material, or similar, was in common use throughout the country). Ridley had to leave the area for a while when the song initially caused consternation with the real live stone sellers. It is apparently the last song written by him.  

The song was featured, along with a number of other Geordie folk songs of yesteryear, in "Geordie The Musical" which premiered at the Customs House in North Shields in 2015 and was recommissioned in 2017 at the Tyne Theatre & Opera House as part of their 150-year anniversary celebrations.

Lyrics 

The song was first published in 1862 by Thomas Allan in his book of a collection of Tyneside songs.  The music was by Harry Clifton (1832–1872) originally composed and performed by him as "Pretty Polly Perkins of Paddington Green", though possibly not published in the original version until a year or two after the words to "Cushey Butterfield" had appeared in print. 

The version below is taken from the 1873 edition of the book, now titled "A Choice collection of Tyneside songs, by Wilson, Corvan, Mitford, Gilchrist, Robson, Harrison ... with the lives of the authors, illustrated with views of the town and portraits of the poets and eccentrics of Newcastle". It appears on pages 220 & 221.
This version is as follows:

CUSHEY BUTTERFIELD'
Air – “Pretty Polly Perkins of Paddington Green”
THE LAST SONG WRITTEN BY GEORGE RIDLEY.

For a translation, see Geordie dialect words

Places mentioned 

Gyetshead is Gateshead, the town on the opposite (south) side of the River Tyne from Newcastle upon Tyne
Sandgate pronounced Sandgit, is (or was) an area of the town named from the Sand Gate, one of the six main gates in the Newcastle town wall, a medieval defensive wall, the remaining parts of which are a Scheduled Ancient Monument. The quayside section of the wall was pulled down in 1763 and the Sand Gate in 1798. In 1701 the Keelmen's Hospital was built in the Sandgate area of the city, using funds provided by the keelmen. This building still stands today. Shipcote was a colliery in Gateshead.

Trades mentioned 

Keelman were the dockers of yesteryear, who worked on the keels (or keelboats) of the River Tyne. Many, in fact the majority, resided as a close-knit community with their families in the Sandgate area, to the east of the city and beside the river. Their work included working on the keels/keelboats which were used to transfer coal from the river banks to the waiting colliers, for transport to various destinations including London. A hewer is a Geordie and mining term for the miner who digs the coal.

A muckman is a sewage worker.

Comments on variations to the above version 

NOTE – 
 Generally – "HER" is pronounced (and usually in later versions spelt) "HOR"
 "CUSHY" is spelt differently in Verse 1 line 3 and the chorus from that in the song title "CUSHEY" or modern day "CUSHIE"
 Verse 1 line 1 "AW" (meaning “I”) is now, and in later versions, often spelt "Aa" or "I's"
 line 1 "HEARTED" is (often in later versions" spelt "HAIRTED"
 line 2 & verse 2 line 2 – "YUNG" is spelt differently from the standard spelling "young" in those lines, but the spelling "young" appears in verse 2 line 4
 Chorus (or KORUS) - "CALL" is pronounced (and in some later versions spelt) "CAALL"
 "BEER" is (in some later versions) spelt "BEOR"
 Verse 3 line 1 "SANDGATE" pronounced (and later often written as) "SANDGIT"
 line 2 "SAWDUST" pronounced (and later often spelt) "SAARDUST"
 line 3 "GOLASHES" (the Geordie term for, and later mis-spelt as) "GALOSHES"
 Verse 4 line 1 "WHEN" pronounced (and now often spelt) "WHAN"
  line 1 the "ME" after marry is now often witten (and sung as) "US"
  line 2 the publisher has inserted an extra  space after monkey

Recordings

 Owen Brannigan (1908-1973) was one of England's most popular bass singers in his day. His E.P. Folk Songs From Northumbria (ref 7EG 8551) included Cushie Butterfield together with six other titles
Brendan Grace had a number 1 hit with the song in 1975. His version is often associated with being amongst the most popular. 
 YouTube recording. by Owen Brannigan

See also
Geordie dialect words
Pretty Polly Perkins of Paddington Green

References

External links 
 Farne Folk Archive Resource North East
 Tyne & Wear Archives & Museums

English folk songs
Football songs and chants
Songs related to Newcastle upon Tyne
1860s songs
Northumbrian folklore